Manakamana Temple (IAST: Manakāmanā Mandira) is a Hindu temple dedicated to goddess Bhagwati, an incarnation of Parvati and it is situated in the village of Manakamana in Gorkha District, Gandaki Province, Nepal.

Location, architecture and shrines 
Many mountains can be seen from the hill including the Annapurna II, Lamjung Himal, and Baudha which is part of Manaslu, the eighth-highest mountain in the world. Alternatively, pilgrims can take the Manakamana Cable Car which was built in 1998 for about US$7.5 million.

It is a two-storey temple and is built in the traditional Nepalese pagoda style, features a ambulatory outside, and spans over 7,659 ropani (3.8930 Square kilometres) of land.

Legend 
According to Nepali legend, Manakamana Temple was built in the 17th century during the reign of two Kings of Gorkha, Ram Shah or Prithvipati Shah. The Queen of Gorkha possessed "divine powers" of Manakamana which was only known by the persist Lakhan Thapa. One fine day, the king saw his wife in form of Goddess Manakamana, and persist as a lion, after he told her about this the king mysteriously died. Per historical Hindu practice of Sati, the queen sacrificed herself by sitting atop her deceased husband's funeral pyre. Prior to her death, she told Thapa that she would appear again, six months later, a farmer working on the field split a stone which apparently started a stream of blood and milk. After hearing about this, Thapa went to where the stone was located and started to do Hindu tantric rituals which halted the stream.

Later he built a shrine at the same spot so that their wishes can come true, and also the persist of the temple necessity should be the ancestor of Thapa. Manakamana is thought to be Champawati, wife of Ram Shah, she reappeared during his son Dambar Shah's reign, and according to other sources indicate that she appeared during the reign of Prithvi Narayan Shah, founder of present-day Nepal. The temple is the holy site of Goddess Bhagawati devi, an incarnation of Lakshmi with Garud as protector. Mana translates as "heart" and "kamana" as "wish" and it is believed that the Bhagwati grants wishes of its devotees.

History 
In 1764-65, Prithvi Narayan Shah began a trust to worship Manakamana, Bareyshwar Mahadev, and to feed the pigeons every day. Later, he made that vajracharya priests to worship the temple and donated a bronze bell, however, another source says that Girvan Yuddha Bikram Shah had donated it. According to another engraving, in 1802-3, four siblings: Sur Bir, Kar Bir, Fauda Singh, and Khagda Singh built the gold plated the main gate. In 1893-4, the bell was repaired by Kulman Thapa, and during the reign of Surendra Bikram Shah the top roof was built with corrugated copper sheets. King Mahendra replaced the roof and added copper roofing and later roof truss were engraved to feature images of Asta Matrikas: Brahamayani. Vaisanavi, Maheswari, Indrayani, and Kumari.

Manakamana Temple started to lean six inches towards south-west after the 1934 Nepal–India earthquake and 1988 Nepal earthquake. The April 2015 Nepal earthquake made cracks on the roof and titled the temple 9-12 inches in the direction of north-east. In June 2015, reconstruction began under the supervision of Department of Archaeology with the budget of 130-140 million Nepalese rupees (NPR), and it was finished in September 2018. Limestone, surkhi, bricks and wood were used in the restoration process, and the roof, the door, the finial, and windows were gold-plated with 14 kilograms of gold which costed about 90 million NPR.

Worship 

Darshan comes from the Sanskrit word meaning sight. The pilgrimage to Manakamana is made by a great many people every year. This religious expedition to see the Goddess Bhagwati at Manakamana is hence referred to as Manakamana Darshan. According to Hindu mythology the universe is said to consist of five cosmic elements- earth, fire, water, air and ether. The offerings to the Goddess are made on this basis. At least one of the following should be amongst the worship materials:
 Abiir (vermillion)
 Kesar badam  (pure saffron and almond )
 Flowers and leaves
 Dhup (incense)
 Diyo (oil lamp)
 Bastra (Cloth, usually in red as it is considered auspicious)
 Fruit and foods such as coconuts and sweet desserts
 Bell
 Betel nut and jannai (sacred thread)
 Anna, grain (rice)
 saubhagya (red cloth, Chura, pota, etc.)

There is a tradition of sacrificing animals at the temple. Some pilgrims sacrifice goats or pigeons in a pavilion behind the temple. However, recently the District Livestock Service Office, Gorkha has banned the sacrifice of birds such as pigeons, roosters, and ducks to name a few. Senior livestock service officer Chhetra Bahadur K.C. said poultry sacrifice would not be permitted until further notice.

Manakamana darshan is most popular during Dashain (Sept –Oct) and Nag Panchami (July –August) during which time devotees stand for as long as five to ten hours to pray to Goddess Bhagwati.

File:Way to Manakamana Morning view 1.jpg| Road towards Manakamana

Cable car

In earlier times, the only way to reach the Manakamana temple was by a long strenuous trek for about three hours. The cable car usually operates during the daytime from 9 am to 5 pm and stops during lunch break from noon to half past one. His Royal Highness Crown Prince Dipendra Bir Bikram Shah Dev inaugurated Manakamana cable car on 24 November 1998. The cable car system was imported from Austria and guarantees a hundred percent safety. It has features such as automatically operated generators in case of power failure and hydraulic emergency drive. The employees working at the cable car service are qualified and well trained for emergencies.

The bottom station of the cable car is placed at Kurintar and the top station is at Mankamana.  With 31 passenger cars and 3 cargo cars, the cable car can handle up to 600 persons per hour. The number of passengers per carrier is 6.

In popular culture 

 The 2013 documentary film "Manakamana" documents various groups of individuals riding the cable car.

References

Citations
 
 

Hindu goddesses
Hindu temples in Gandaki Province
Tourist attractions in Nepal
17th-century establishments in Nepal
Buildings and structures in Gorkha District
Parvati temples